The buff-rumped warbler (Myiothlypis fulvicauda) is a New World warbler that is resident from Honduras south to northwestern Peru and disjunctly in the western Amazon. It is found in forests at up to 1500 m altitude, always near water.

The pair builds a bulky domed nest with a side entrance on a sloping bank next to a stream or path, and the female lays two white eggs which are incubated for 16–17 days with another 13–14 days to fledging.

The buff-rumped warbler is 13–13.5 cm long and weighs 14.5 g.  The nominate race M. f. fulvicauda of western Amazonia in Colombia, Ecuador, Peru and Brazil is dark olive-brown above with a grey head, buff supercilium, and the conspicuous rich buff rump and upper tail that give this species its English and scientific names. The lower half of the tail is blackish. The underparts are whitish with some buff on the flanks. The sexes are similar, but the young bird is browner on the upperparts, head and breast, and its rump is paler.

There are five other subspecies.

 M. f. semicervina, is found in the Chocó from eastern Panama to north-western Peru. It is similar to fulvicauda, but the buff area of the tail is larger and paler, and the buff on the flanks is more extensive.
 M. f. motacilla, from the Magdalena Valley in Colombia, is similar to semicervina, but the buff area of the tail is paler, and upperparts more olive.
 M. f. leucopygia, from the Caribbean slope in Central America is a distinctive form, with a much paler buff rump, a white supercilium, dark legs, and dark spotting on the breast.
 M. f. veraguensis, from the Pacific slope in Central America is like leucopygia, but less spotted and with a somewhat darker rump.
 M. f. significans of south-eastern Peru and northern Bolivia has a less extensive buff rump than other subspecies, and olive upperparts.

This is a common species, easily seen and identified as it hops on the ground, pumping and swinging its broad tail constantly. The buff-rumped warbler primarily feeds on insects, spiders and other small invertebrates, taken on the ground or in flight in open areas along the banks of streams, puddles, roadsides or tracks. Pairs defend their linear feeding territories along a stretch of stream throughout the year.

The call note of the buff-rumped warbler is a hard tschik like northern waterthrush, and the male's song is a warble followed by a series of 8-15 ringing chew notes. The female may give a soft reply.

References

 Curson, Quinn and Beadle, New World Warblers 
 Stiles and Skutch,  A guide to the birds of Costa Rica

Further reading

buff-rumped warbler
Birds of Nicaragua
Birds of Costa Rica
Birds of Panama
Birds of Colombia
Birds of Ecuador
Birds of the Peruvian Amazon
Birds of the Amazon Basin
buff-rumped warbler